The Terrorist is a 1962 Argentine thriller film directed by Daniel Cherniavsky.

The film's art direction was by Gori Muñoz.

Cast
 Emilio Alfaro 
 Jorge Cavanet as José María  
 Oscar Ferrigno 
 María Rosa Gallo 
 Beto Gianola 
 Jacinto Herrera 
 Virginia Lago 
 Alberto Lares 
 Oscar Llompart 
 Horacio Nicolai

References

Bibliography 
 Helene C. Weldt-Basson. Postmodernism's Role in Latin American Literature: The Life and Work of Augusto Roa Bastos. Springer, 2010.

External links 
 

1962 films
1960s thriller films
Argentine thriller films
1960s Spanish-language films
Films directed by Daniel Cherniavsky
1960s Argentine films